Grant Township is a township in Story County, Iowa, USA.  As of the 2000 census, its population was 1068.

Geography
According to the USGS, it contains one cemetery: Saint Patrick Catholic Cemetery.

 Interstate 35 runs north and south through the township and  U.S. Route 30 runs east–west near the northern part of the township.

References
 USGS Geographic Names Information System (GNIS)

External links
 US-Counties.com
 City-Data.com

Townships in Story County, Iowa
Townships in Iowa